This is a list of members of the Walloon Parliament between 1999 and 2004, following the direct elections of 1999.

Composition

By party

PS (25)
 Patrick Avril replaced Laurette Onkelinx (16.7.99)
 Maurice Bayenet, leader
 Richard Biefnot
 Maurice Bodson
 Robert Collignon, président du parlement (àpd 5.4.00)
 Frédéric Daerden replaced José Happart (ministre-16.7.99)
 Freddy Deghilage
 Marc de Saint Moulin replaced Willy Taminiaux (7.2.2001)
 Nicole Docq replaced Bernard Anselme (31.1.01)
 Paul Ficheroulle replaced Jean-Claude Van Cauwenberghe (ministre-12.7.99)
 Didier Donfut
 Michel Filleul replaced Christian Dupont (24.9.03)
 Paul Furlan
 Gil Gilles
 Gustave Hofman
  Jean-François Istasse
 Jean-Marie Léonard
 Robert Meureau
 Jean Namotte
 André Navez
 Jean-Pierre Perdieu
  Francis Poty
 Edmund Stoffels
 Pierre Wacquier remplace Annick Saudoyer (5.6.03) replaced Christian Massy (12.3.01), who replaced Rudy Demotte (17.1.01 et ministre 16.7.99–4.4.00)
 Léon Walry

PRL (21) 
 Claude Ancion
 Chantal Bertouille, leader (jusque 16.9.01)
 Jean Bock
 Pierre Boucher
 Véronique Cornet
 André Damseaux
 Jean-Pierre Dardenne
  Christine Defraigne replaced Michel Foret (ministre-16.7.99)
 Philippe Fontaine, chef de groupe (àpd 16.9.01)
 Claudy Huart replaced Jean-Pierre Dauby(†) (24.4.00)
 Michel Joiret replaced Hervé Jamar (14.7.03), who replaced Pierre Hazette (31.12.00)
 Michel Huin
 Gérard Mathieu
 Richard Miller, replaced by Pierre Fortez (17.1.01–6.6.03)
 Marcel Neven
 Jacques Otlet replaced Serge Kubla (ministre-12.7.99)
 Florine Pary-Mille
 Guy Saulmont
 Annie Servais-Thysen
 Jean-Marie Séverin (ministre-12.7.99–17.10.00 : replaced by Patrick Bioul)
 Jean-Paul Wahl

ECOLO (14) 
 Marie-Rose Cavalier-Bohon replaced Philippe Defeyt (26.1.00)
  Marcel Cheron
 Xavier Desgain, leader
  Michel Guilbert
 Jean-Claude Hans replaced Jean-Michel Javaux (24.9.03)
 Pierre Hardy
 Philippe Henry
 Daniel Josse
 Alain Pieters replaced Nicole Maréchal (31.12.00)
 Daniel Smeets
 Luc Tiberghien
 Alain Trussart replaced  Marc Hordies (17.9.02)
 Monique Vlaminck-Moreau
 Bernard Wesphael

PSC (14) 
 André Antoine, leader
 André Bouchat
  Christian Brotcorne replaced Georges Seneca(†) (20.11.02)
 Philippe Charlier
 Anne-Marie Corbisier-Hagon
 Michel de Lamotte replaced William Ancion (21.2.01)
 Jacques Étienne
 Guy Hollogne
 Elmar Keutgen
 Michel Lebrun
 Albert Liénard
 André Namotte replaced Ghislain Hiance (24.4.01)
 Pierre Scharff
 René Thissen

FN (1)

List
Walloon Parliament
1999 in Belgium
2000s in Belgium